Rhodosciadium is a genus of flowering plants belonging to the family Apiaceae.

It is native to Mexico and Guatemala.
 
The genus name of Rhodosciadium is in honour of Joseph Nelson Rose (1862–1928), an American botanist. Note the Greek for 'Rose' is (rhódon). It issed for red-colored or rose-like. It was first described and published in Proc. Amer. Acad. Arts Vol.25 on page 151 in 1890.

Known species
According to Kew:
Rhodosciadium argutum 
Rhodosciadium diffusum 
Rhodosciadium dissectum 
Rhodosciadium glaucum 
Rhodosciadium longipes 
Rhodosciadium macrophyllum 
Rhodosciadium macvaughiae 
Rhodosciadium montanum 
Rhodosciadium nelsonii 
Rhodosciadium nudicaule 
Rhodosciadium pringlei 
Rhodosciadium purpureum 
Rhodosciadium rzedowskii 
Rhodosciadium tolucense 
Rhodosciadium tuberosum

References

Apioideae
Plants described in 1890
Flora of Mexico
Flora of Guatemala